Sean Wilson (born 4 April 1965 in Ashton-under-Lyne, Lancashire) is an English actor and cheesemaker, best known for his role as Martin Platt in Coronation Street, which he played from 1985 to 2005 and for a brief stint in 2018.

Career
Wilson joined the cast of Coronation Street in 1985 as Martin Platt. The character was 16, had left school and taken a job at the cafe managed by Gail Tilsley. Five years later, Gail was a widow and he became involved with her romantically. They married, divorced, and in between he became father to David Platt. Wilson has said the main reason for leaving the serial in 2005 was because producers informed him of a storyline where he would date an underage girl and he did not agree with it. He subsequently appeared in several other UK television dramas, including an appearance in Waterloo Road as Darren Briggs, Sr, a student's father whose crush on teacher Davina Shackleton gets out of hand.

Wilson also became a chef after leaving Coronation Street. He has cooked in several Michelin-starred restaurants, and is also a cheesemaker and purveyor of cheesy comestibles with his own business, Saddleworth Cheese Company. His book The Great Northern Cookbook was published in 2012. The accompanying TV series was shown on Channel 5, starting in January 2013. In 2018, Wilson reprised his role as Martin Platt in Coronation Street for a few episodes.

Wilson is also a patron of a UK charity, Development of Children and Women Centre Nepal.

Filmography

Book
 Cheddar Gorged (Great Northern Books, 10 October 2022)

References

External links

 Corrie Net biography and details of early career
 Digital Spy article - "Sean Wilson Happy to be Leaving Corrie"
 Saddleworth Cheese Company

1965 births
Living people
English male soap opera actors
English chefs
People from Ashton-under-Lyne
Actors from Lancashire